Sharon Lee may refer to:

 Sharon Lee (judoka) (born 1963), British Olympic judoka
 Sharon Lee (writer) (born 1952), American writer
 Sharon G. Lee (born 1953), justice on the Tennessee Supreme Court
 Sharon Lee (singer) (born 1988), Hong Kong singer
 Sharon Lee (sport shooter) (born 1976), English Commonwealth Games medallist
 Sharon Lee (politician), acting borough president of Queens, in New York City

See also
 Sharon Lee Myers (born 1941), birth name of American singer-songwriter Jackie DeShannon
 Sharon-Lee Lane, Australian country music singer